The 2007–08 Serie C2 season was the thirtieth football (soccer) league season of Italian Serie C2 since its establishment in  1978 . It was divided into two phases: the regular season, played from September 2007 to May 2008, and the playoff phase from May to June 2008.

The league was composed of 54 teams divided into three divisions of 18 teams each, whose teams will be divided geographically.

Teams finishing first in the regular season, plus one team winning the playoff round from each division were promoted to Serie C1; teams finishing last in the regular season, plus two relegation playoff losers from each division were relegated to Serie D.  In all, six teams were promoted to Serie C1, and nine teams were relegated to Serie D.

Events
The line-up was announced on July 19, 2007. The only team excluded because of financial troubles was Tempio, Serie D - Girone B winners in 2006–07. On August 3, 2007 it was announced that the vacancy would be filled by Serie D - Girone B runners-up U.S. Calcio Caravaggese (formerly USO Calcio Caravaggio).

The league features six teams relegated from Serie C1 in 2006–07 (Pizzighettone, Ivrea, Pavia, Teramo, San Marino and Giulianova) and nine promoted from Serie D (Canavese, Mezzocorona, Rodengo Saiano, Esperia Viareggio, Valle del Giovenco, Scafatese, Noicattaro, Neapolis and Calcio Caravaggese).

Standings

Serie C2/A
Final standings

Serie C2/B
Final standings

Serie C2/C
Final standings

Promotion and relegation playoffs

Serie C2/A

Promotion
Promotion playoff semifinals
First legs to be played May 18, 2008; return legs to be played May 25, 2008

Promotion playoff finals
First leg to be played June 1, 2008; return leg played to be June 8, 2008

Lumezzane promoted to Serie C1

Relegation
Relegation playoffs
First legs to be played May 18, 2008; return legs to be played May 25, 2008

Cuneo and Calcio Caravaggese relegated to Serie D

Serie C2/B

Promotion
Promotion playoff semifinals
First legs to be played May 18, 2008; return legs to be played May 25, 2008

Promotion playoff finals
First leg to be played June 1, 2008; return leg played to be June 8, 2008

Portosummaga promoted to Serie C1

Relegation
Relegation playoffs
First legs to be played May 18, 2008; return legs to be played May 25, 2008

Viterbese and Rovigo relegated to Serie D

Serie C2/C

Promotion
Promotion playoff semifinals
First legs to be played May 18, 2008; return legs to be played May 25, 2008

Promotion playoff finals
First leg to be played June 1, 2008; return leg played to be June 8, 2008

Real Marcianise promoted to Serie C1

Relegation
Relegation playoffs
First legs to be played May 18, 2008; return legs to be played May 25, 2008

Andria and Val di Sangro relegated to Serie D

Clubs

Serie C2/A

Serie C2/B

Serie C2/C

References

Serie C2 seasons
Italy
4